Cancer Research is a biweekly peer-reviewed medical journal published by the American Association for Cancer Research. It covers research on all aspects of cancer and cancer-related biomedical sciences and was established in 1941. The editor-in-chief is Chi Van Dang.
 
The journal was established in 1916 as the Journal of Cancer Research, was renamed American Journal of Cancer in 1931, and obtained its current name in 1941.

Abstracting and indexing
The journal is abstracted and indexed in:

According to the Journal Citation Reports, the journal has a 2020 impact factor of 12.701.

References

External links
 

Oncology journals
Publications established in 1916
English-language journals
Biweekly journals
American Association for Cancer Research academic journals